Rohit Suresh Saraf (born 8 December 1996) is an Indian actor who primarily works in Hindi films and web series. He began his career on television and made his film debut with a supporting role in Dear Zindagi (2016). He went on to feature in the Norwegian film What Will People Say (2017), the comedy-drama Hichki (2018), the biopic The Sky Is Pink (2019), the black comedy Ludo (2020), and the thriller Vikram Vedha (2022). Since 2020, he has starred in the Netflix romantic comedy series Mismatched.

Early life 
Rohit Saraf was born on 8 December 1996 in Kathmandu, Nepal into an Indian family. He moved back with his family to Delhi when he was five. He was then raised in Delhi but moved to Mumbai when he started modelling. 

His father, Suresh Saraf, died when Rohit was 12 years old. He completed his early education at the Saint Francis D'Assisi High School. He then went to St. Xavier’s College, Mumbai for graduation.

Career
Saraf began his career with several television shows, including the Channel V's teen drama Best Friends Forever?. He also featured in school cinema's short film "Medium". He made his film debut as the younger brother of Alia Bhatt's character in the coming-of-age film Dear Zindagi (2016). Saraf then played the cousin of the lead character in the Norwegian drama What Will People Say, which was selected as the Norwegian entry for the Best Foreign Language Film at the 91st Academy Awards.

In 2018, Saraf appeared in Yash Raj Films' comedy-drama Hichki, starring Rani Mukerji. He then starred alongside Priyanka Chopra and Zaira Wasim in the biographical drama The Sky Is Pink (2019). Reviewing the film for NDTV, Saibal Chatterjee wrote that Saraf "gives a solid account of himself" and Anna M. M. Vetticad of Firstpost opined that he "delivers a rock solid performance".

Saraf next appeared alongside an ensemble cast in Anurag Basu's Ludo. He also starred alongside Prajakta Koli in the Netflix romantic drama series Mismatched.

He then went on to play a leading role opposite Anandhi in the Tamil romantic drama Kamali From Nadukkaveri in his Tamil debut. His most recent appearance is in an anthology, a Netflix original Feels Like Ishq released in July 2021. He plays the role of a house host Aditya in the short Star Host directed by Anand Tiwari.

Saraf appeared in Vikram Vedha (2022) where he played Hritik Roshan's brother, and will next star in the romantic comedy Ishq Vishq Rebound.

Media 
Saraf was ranked at No. 39 in The Times Most Desirable Men in 2020.

Filmography

Films 

All films are in Hindi unless otherwise noted.

Television

Web series

Music video

References

External links

 
 

Living people
Indian male film actors
Male actors in Hindi cinema
21st-century Indian male actors
1996 births
Actors from Kathmandu
Male actors from Delhi
Male actors from Mumbai